Et Sans was a Canadian experimental rock band from Montreal. Their music was characterized by lengthy compositions with lyrics in French, combined with loud, distortion-filled electronic and instrumental sounds with a heavy bass beat .

History

The band was formed by former Godspeed You! Black Emperor guitarist Roger Tellier-Craig and Alexandre St-Onge from the Shalabi Effect. The duo released their first album, l'Autre, in 2001 on the Locust Music label.

After expanding their group to include Felix Morel, Sophie Trudeau, and Stephen De Oliveira, they recorded Par Noussss Touss Les Trous de Vos Crânes!, their second album in 2005. It was their first release on Alien8 Recordings, and combined post-industrial, electronic and hard rock sounds.

Discography
Studio albums
 l'Autre (2001)
 Par Noussss Touss Les Trous de Vos Crânes! (2005)

See also
 List of bands from Canada
 List of Quebec musicians
 Music of Quebec

References

External links
 Alien8 Recordings' Official Homepage

Alien8 Recordings artists
Canadian experimental rock groups
Musical groups established in 2000
Musical groups disestablished in 2006
Musical groups from Montreal
2000 establishments in Quebec
2006 disestablishments in Quebec